Express Media is an Australian literary youth arts organisation, founded in 1983. Originally called Express Australia, the organisation is currently listed on the Register of Cultural Organisations. It presents an annual program of special events, workshops, exhibitions and artistic projects throughout the year, to generate opportunities for young and emerging artists. The flagship project is Voiceworks magazine, and author John Marsden (writer) is the organisation's patron.

Projects
Express Media is responsible for the following community development projects:
 The John Marsden Prize for Young Australian Writers. A total prize pool of $3500 is offered across four categories. Presented annually since 2005, winners are published in the December Voiceworks.
 Buzzcuts, an annual arts review project, presented in conjunction with Melbourne Fringe, 3RRR, SYN Youth Media, Beat Magazine and RMIT. 
 Mentorships. Express Media's mentorship programme has included the Australian writers: Christos Tsiolkas, Linda Jaivin, Adam Ford, Anna Krien, Lally Katz and Shalini Akhil.
 An Australia-wide workshop programme, covering zine production, media laws and numerous other areas where Express Media has determined there to be a need.
 Express Media also releases occasional once-off self-published projects like Inncommunicado and Tiny Epics.

External links 

 Express Media Homepage
 A voice for erudite youth
 Mentorships for Young Writers

Notes

1983 establishments in Australia
Culture of Melbourne
Youth-led media
Organizations established in 1983